Givaldo Santos Vasconcelos (born 2 February 1956), commonly known as Jacozinho, is a Brazilian retired footballer who played as a winger.

Playing career
Jacozinho was born in Gararu, Sergipe, and started his career with Vasco-SE in 1976. In the following year, he moved to neighbouring Sergipe, playing his first national championship and later representing clubs in the state of Bahia.

In late 1980, Jacozinho joined CSA. There, he featured regularly as the club finished second in the Série B three times and won the Campeonato Alagoano five times, and was somehow invited to Zico's friendly in 1985, celebrated due to his return to Flamengo; he was included in the Amigos do Zico (Zico's Friends) squad. In that match, he scored the only goal of Zico's team, after receiving a pass from Diego Maradona; the match ended 3–1 for Flamengo.

After gaining national notoriety due to the friendly goal, Jacozinho joined Santa Cruz, He came back to CSA in 1987, and subsequently represented Nacional-AM, Baraúnas, ABC, Rio Branco-AC, Imperatriz, Flamengo-PI and Ypiranga-PE, retiring in 1994.

Post-playing career
Jacozinho also worked as Magno Malta's advisor for a nearly 15 years before charging him for mobbing. In 2012, he returned to his main club CSA, as an assistant manager of the youth sides.

In 2015, Jacozinho became an assistant manager of the main squad, being also manager of the under-20s and interim manager on two occasions in 2017 and 2018. On 30 November 2019, after Argel Fucks left for Ceará, he was named interim manager for the latter three matches of the Série A.

Honours
CSA
Campeonato Alagoano: 1980, 1981, 1982 e 1984

Santa Cruz
Campeonato Pernambucano: 1986

References

External links

1956 births
Living people
Sportspeople from Sergipe
Brazilian footballers
Association football forwards
Club Sportivo Sergipe players
Galícia Esporte Clube players
Associação Desportiva Jequié players
Centro Sportivo Alagoano players
Santa Cruz Futebol Clube players
Nacional Futebol Clube players
ABC Futebol Clube players
Rio Branco Football Club players
Brazilian football managers
Centro Sportivo Alagoano managers